Everton Macedo Dias (born 4 June 1990) is a Brazilian professional footballer who plays as a defensive midfielder for Santa Cruz.

References

External links

1990 births
Living people
Brazilian footballers
Brazilian expatriate footballers
Campeonato Brasileiro Série B players
Campeonato Brasileiro Série C players
First Professional Football League (Bulgaria) players
Mogi Mirim Esporte Clube players
Oeste Futebol Clube players
Capivariano Futebol Clube players
Clube Atlético Bragantino players
Associação Atlética Aparecidense players
Tombense Futebol Clube players
Clube Atlético Tubarão players
Veranópolis Esporte Clube Recreativo e Cultural players
Brusque Futebol Clube players
Luverdense Esporte Clube players
FC Tsarsko Selo Sofia players
Sampaio Corrêa Futebol Clube players
Association football midfielders
Footballers from São Paulo
Expatriate footballers in Bulgaria
Brazilian expatriate sportspeople in Bulgaria